McCullough Park is a park located in the Independence Heights neighborhood of Houston, Texas, which is listed on the National Register of Historic Places. It was originally called Independence Park but was renamed by the city of Houston after its acquisition of Houston Heights in 1929.

Its NRHP nomination states: "Independence Park is the only public space remaining from the early years of Independence Heights. In 1910, the Wright Land Company set aside some eight lots in the northeast portion of the subdivision for a community park and named it Independence Park. The park provided important community space for church gatherings, school activities, and annual Juneteenth celebrations. Although parks were often part of white neighborhoods during this period, few African American communities had such dedicated space and few larger community parks were open to blacks."

Elsewhere segregation in parks "was enforced by custom first and then by local ordinance in 1922".

It was listed on the National Register in 1997 as "Independence Park".

See also
 National Register of Historic Places listings in Harris County, Texas

References

External links
 

1910 establishments in Texas
National Register of Historic Places in Houston
Parks on the National Register of Historic Places in Texas
Parks in Houston
Protected areas established in 1910